Queenhill  is a civil parish and hamlet in the Malvern Hills District of  the county of Worcestershire, England. It is one of three parishes administered by the Parish Council of Longdon, Queenhill and Holdfast.

Parish church 
The church, which is dedicated to St Nicholas, serves both Queenhill and Holdfast.

References 

Hamlets in Worcestershire
Civil parishes in Worcestershire